Akuliaruseq is a Greenland village of 4 inhabitants (January 2005) and is part of the municipality of Kujalleq.

References 

Kujalleq
Greenland